Runar Patriksson (born 1944) is a Swedish Liberal People's Party politician, member of the Riksdag 1998–2006.

References

Members of the Riksdag from the Liberals (Sweden)
Living people
1944 births
Members of the Riksdag 2002–2006
Members of the Riksdag 1998–2002
20th-century Swedish politicians
21st-century Swedish politicians